Group of Eleven (G11) is a forum, constituted by mostly developing countries aimed at easing their debt burden (government debt), narrowing the income gap with rich countries and lifting their people out of poverty.

History

King Abdullah of Jordan first proposed the group in 2005.

Objective
The group of eleven is a forum, constituted by mostly developing countries aimed at easing their debt burden and narrowing the gap with rich countries to lift, ‘millions out of poverty’. The specific aim is to garner market access and writing off of the debt burden so that these countries can focus all their resources on generating growth and stability.

Creation
The group was created on 20 September 2006. The group comprises mostly lower-middle-income countries.

Members
The members consist of Jordan, Croatia, Ecuador, Georgia, El Salvador, Honduras, Indonesia, Morocco, Pakistan, Paraguay, and Sri Lanka.

The request is made to the G8.

May 2007 summit

G11 developing countries at their Summit at the Jordanian Dead Sea resort have agreed to push for cooperation with G8 industrialized nations to ease their debts and build prosperous economies. These countries and in fact most of the developing countries require fiscal and monetary space to maintain momentum on progress to lay the foundation for a diversified and sustainable economic growth.

The group asked for exploring avenues for enhancing cooperation among member states to shape their future development needs and strategies as well as greater cooperation with international partners for market access, enhanced productive capacities and development of scientific and technological skills and converting debts to financing aid projects.

G11 countries need targeted assistance and support from the developed countries to accelerate growth, lift millions from poverty and hasten the delivery of the fruits of reforms and social development to larger segments of their population. The G11 group need to enter into political dialogue with the G8 countries for their support to meet development objectives, encourage investment and have greater market access. 

Outstanding Debt on the developing countries places a great burden on export earnings and fiscal revenues. Moreover, tariffs imposed by the G8 and other developed countries on imports are the major hurdles in the way of improving the living standard of the peoples of the developing and under developed countries through export led growth.

G11 proposal on debt

The G11 argues that it is in the interest of the G8 and others to enter into arrangement with the indebted countries and convert the debts into assistance for social development projects so that the poor masses could reap the fruits of development. This would help in reducing the gap between the rich and the poor, create more job opportunities, alleviate poverty and contribute to creating an atmosphere of goodwill, fraternity and understanding among the peoples leading to the cherished objective of prosperity, peace and stability around the globe.

External links
 
 

Intergovernmental organizations
Third World debt cancellation activism
International economic organizations
Economic country classifications
21st-century diplomatic conferences (Global)
Organizations established in 2006
Trade blocs
2006 in economics